Yakonskoye is a rural locality (a village) in Tonshalovskoye Rural Settlement, Cherepovetsky District, Vologda Oblast, Russia. The population was 58 as of 2002.

Geography 
Yakonskoye is located 6 km northeast of Cherepovets (the district's administrative centre) by road. Cherepovets is the nearest rural locality.

References 

Rural localities in Cherepovetsky District